Xinjiangchelys is an extinct genus of xinjiangchelyid turtle known from the Middle Jurassic to Early Cretaceous of China and Kyrgyzstan. It is known from over 11 different species.

Taxonomy 

 Xinjiangchelys wuerhoensis
 Xinjiangchelys naryensis
 Xinjiangchelys chowi
 Xinjiangchelys jingyanensis
 Xinjiangchelys jinyanensis
 Xinjiangchelys junggarensis
 Xinjiangchelys latiens
 Xinjiangchelys latimarginalis
 Xinjiangchelys oshanensis
 Xinjiangchelys qiguensis
 Xinjiangchelys radiplicatoides
 Xinjiangchelys radiplicatus
 Xinjiangchelys tianshanensis
 Xinjiangchelys wusu

References

Testudinata
Jurassic turtles
Early Cretaceous turtles
Fossils of China
Fossils of Kyrgyzstan
Fossil taxa described in 1986